Left Hand Talking is the eighth studio album by the British singer-songwriter Judie Tzuke, released in 1991.

Despite considerable promotion and featuring a re-recording of her best known song, "Stay with Me till Dawn", the album failed to chart. It was the last of Tzuke's albums to be released by a major record label. Her next album, Wonderland, was released on an independent label, and all subsequent albums have been released on her own home label, Big Moon Records.

Track listing
Side one
 "One Day I Will Live in France" (Judie Tzuke, Paul Muggleton, Bob Noble) – 4:25
 "I Could Feel You" (Muggleton, Noble) – 3:59
 "Liam" (Tzuke, Noble) – 3:50
 "Left Hand Talking" (Tzuke) – 4:38
 "Jesus Was a Cross Maker" (Judee Sill) – 3:35 (Judee Sill cover)

Side two
 "Stay with Me 'till Dawn" (Tzuke, Mike Paxman) – 3:49
 "God Only Knows" (Brian Wilson, Tony Asher) – 2:49 (The Beach Boys cover)
 "Bailey's Song" (Tzuke, Noble) – 3:41
 "Calling Me Back" (Tzuke) – 4:21
 "Outlaws" (Tzuke) – 3:59

Personnel
Band members
Judie Tzuke – lead and backing vocals, keyboards
Mike Paxman – guitar, keyboards, percussion, producer, engineer
Bob Noble – keyboards
John Giblin – bass guitar, fretless bass on track 8
Charlie Morgan – drums, percussion
Paul Muggleton – keyboards, percussion, backing vocals, producer, engineer

Additional musicians
Don Snow – keyboards, guitar, backing vocals
Phil Palmer – acoustic and slide guitar on tracks 5, 8
Andy Chamberlain – keyboards on tracks 5, 7
Bobby Paterson – bass guitar on track 3
Andy Sheppard – soprano saxophone on track 4
Nicolette L'Adventure – backing vocals on track 1

Production
Matt Howe, Heidi Cannavo, Craig Sullivan – assistant engineers
Stephen W Tayler – mixing

See also
Thomas Anders – Whispers (1991)

External links
Official website

References 

Judie Tzuke albums
1991 albums
Albums produced by Mike Paxman
Columbia Records albums